The Saint Francis School District is a public school district in Milwaukee County, Wisconsin.  The district serves the city of St. Francis, Wisconsin. As of the 2015–16 school year, the district had approximately 1190 enrolled students. The district administrator is Blake Peuse.

Schools 
St. Francis High School, 4225 S. Lake Drive
Deer Creek Intermediate School, 3680 S. Kinnickinnic Ave.
Willow Glen Primary School, 2600 E. Bolivar Ave.

Mergers 

Deer Creek Elementary School was formed as a result of the merger of Thompson and Faircrest Schools in 1992. In 2005, Willow Glen Elementary School was converted into a primary school serving students in kindergarten through third grade, with an intermediate school at the Deer Creek site serving fourth through eighth grades.

External links 
St. Francis School District

School districts in Wisconsin
Education in Milwaukee County, Wisconsin